Unggai Rural LLG is a local-level government (LLG) of Eastern Highlands Province, Papua New Guinea.

Wards
01. Aligayufa
02. Yabiyufa
03. Wando
04. Orumba
05. Orumba-Foe
06. Yauna-Koko

References

Local-level governments of Eastern Highlands Province